"Sun Dirt Water" is a single by the Australian folk-rock band The Waifs, from their 2007 album Sun Dirt Water. "Sun Dirt Water" was written by Vikki Thorn.

Track listing
"Sun Dirt Water" 
"Mess Around"
"Trouble At My Door"

Charts

References

The Waifs songs
2007 singles
2007 songs